The Simele massacre, also known as the Assyrian affair, was committed by the Kingdom of Iraq, led by Bakr Sidqi, during a campaign systematically targeting the Assyrians in and around Simele in August 1933. An estimated 6,000 Assyrians were killed and over 100 Assyrian villages were destroyed and looted.

Background

Assyrians of the mountains
The majority of the Assyrians affected by the massacres were adherents of the Church of the East (often dubbed Nestorian), who originally inhabited the mountainous Hakkari and Barwari regions covering parts of the modern provinces of Hakkâri, Şırnak and Van in Turkey and the Dohuk Governorate in Iraq, with a population ranging between 75,000 and 150,000. Most of these Assyrians were massacred during the 1915 Assyrian genocide, at the hands of the Ottoman Turks, while the rest endured two winter marches to Urmia in 1915 and to Hamadan in 1918. 

Many of them were relocated by the British to refugee camps in Baquba and later to Habbaniyah, and in 1921 some were enlisted in the Assyrian Levies, a military force under British command, which participated in the Kirkuk Massacre of 1924 of Kurds ;Arabs and Turkomen during the ongoing revolts in the British Mandate of Mesopotamia. Most Hakkari Assyrians were resettled after 1925 in a cluster of villages in northern Iraq. Some of the villages where the Assyrians settled were leased directly by the government, while others belonged to Kurdish landlords who had the right to evict them at any time.

Iraqi independence and crisis

During the Ottoman Empire until its partition in the 20th century, Iraq was made up of three provinces: Mosul Vilayet, Baghdad Vilayet, and Basra Vilayet. These three provinces were joined into one Kingdom under the nominal rule of King Faisal by the British after the region became a League of Nations mandate, administered under British control, with the name "State of Iraq". 

Britain granted independence to the Kingdom of Iraq in 1932, on the urging of King Faisal, though the British retained military bases, local militia in the form of Assyrian Levies, and transit rights for their forces. 

From Iraqi nationalists' point of view, the Assyrian Levies were British proxies to be used by their 'masters' to destroy the new Iraqi state, whose independence the British had consistently opposed. Under British protection, the Assyrian Levies had not become Iraqi citizens until 1924. The British allowed their Assyrian auxiliary troops to retain their arms after independence and granted them special duty and privileges, guarding military air installations and receiving higher pay than the Iraqi Arab recruits. The nationalists believed the British were hoping for the Assyrians to destroy Iraq's internal cohesion by becoming independent and by inciting others such as the Kurds to follow their example. In addition, elements of the Iraqi Army resented the British and the Assyrians because the British Army and Assyrian Levies had succeeded in suppressing Kurdish revolts when the Iraqi Army failed. 

The end of the British Mandate of Iraq caused considerable unease among the Assyrians, who felt betrayed by the British. For them, any treaty with the Iraqis had to take into consideration their desire for an autonomous position similar to the Ottoman Millet system. The Iraqis, on the other hand felt that the Assyrians' demands were, alongside the Kurdish disturbances in the north, a conspiracy by the British to divide Iraq by agitating its minorities.

Assyrian demands for autonomy
With Iraqi independence, the new Assyrian spiritual-temporal leader, Shimun XXI Eshai (Catholicos Patriarch of the Assyrian Church of the East), demanded an autonomous Assyrian homeland within Iraq, seeking support from the United Kingdom and pressing his case before the League of Nations in 1932. His followers planned to resign from the Assyrian Levies and to re-group as a militia and concentrate in the north, creating a de facto Assyrian enclave.

In spring 1933, Malik Yaqo, a former Levies officer, was engaged in a propaganda campaign on behalf of Assyrian Patriarch Shimun XXI Eshai (or Mar Shimun), trying to persuade Assyrians not to apply for Iraqi nationality or accept the settlement offered to them by the central government. Yaqo was accompanied by 200 armed men, which was seen as an act of defiance by the Iraqi authorities, while causing distress among the Kurds. The Iraqi government started sending troops to the Dohuk region in order to intimidate Yaqu and dissuade Assyrians from joining his cause.

In June 1933, Shimun XXI Eshai was invited to Baghdad for negotiations with Rashid Ali al-Gaylani's government but was detained there after refusing to relinquish temporal authority. He would eventually be exiled to Cyprus.

Massacres

Clashes at Dirabun
On 21 July 1933, more than 600 Assyrians, led by Yaqo, crossed the border into Syria in hope of receiving asylum from the French Mandate of Syria. They were, however, disarmed and refused asylum, and were subsequently given light arms and sent back to Iraq on 4 August. They then decided to surrender themselves to the Iraqi Army. 

While crossing the Tigris in the Assyrian village of Dirabun, a clash erupted between the Assyrians and an Iraqi Army brigade. Despite the advantage of heavy artillery, the Iraqis were driven back to their military base in Dirabun. 

The Assyrians, convinced that the army had targeted them deliberately, attacked an army barracks with little success. They were driven back to Syria upon the arrival of Iraqi aeroplanes. The Iraqi Army lost 33 soldiers during the fighting while the Assyrian irregulars took fewer casualties. 

Historians do not agree on who started the clashes at the border. The British Administrative Inspector for Mosul, Lieutenant Colonel R. R. Stafford, wrote that the Assyrians had no intention of clashing with the Iraqis, while the Iraqi historian Khaldun Husry (son of the prominent Arab nationalist Sati' al-Husri) claims that it was Yaqo's men who provoked the army at Dirabun. Husry supported the propaganda rumours, which circulated in the Iraqi nationalist newspapers, of the Assyrians mutilating the bodies of the killed Iraqi soldiers, further enraging the Iraqi public against the Assyrians.

Beginning of the massacres

Even though all military activities ceased by 6 August 1933, exaggerated stories of atrocities committed by the Assyrians at Dirabun and anti-Christian propaganda gained currency while rumours circulated that the Christians were planning to blow up bridges up and poison drinking water in major Iraqi cities. 

The Iraqi Army, led by Bakr Sidqi, an experienced brigadier general and Iraqi nationalist, moved north in order to crush the Assyrian revolt. The Iraqi forces started executing every Assyrian male found in the mountainous Bekher region between Zakho and Duhok starting from 8 August 1933. Assyrian civilians were transported in military trucks from Zakho and Dohuk to uninhabited places, in batches of eight or ten, where they were shot with machine guns and run over by heavy armoured cars to make sure no one survived.

Looting of villages
While these killings were taking place, nearby Kurdish, Arab and Yazidi tribes were encouraged to loot Assyrian villages. Kurdish tribes of Gulli, Sindi and Selivani were encouraged by the mayor of Zakho to loot villages to the northeast of Simele, while Yazidis and Kurds also raided Assyrian villages in Shekhan and Amadiya. Most women and children from those villages took refuge in Simele and Dohuk.

On 9 August, the Arab tribes of Shammar and Jubur started crossing to the east bank of the Tigris and raiding Assyrian villages on the plains to the south of Dohuk. They were mostly driven by the loss of a large part of their own livestock to drought in the previous years.

More than 60 Assyrian villages were looted. While women and children were mostly allowed to take refuge in neighbouring villages, men were sometimes rounded up and handed over to the army, by whom they were shot. Some villages were completely burned down and most of them were later inhabited by Kurds.

Massacre in Simele

The town of Simele became the last refuge for Assyrians fleeing from the looted villages. The mayor of Zakho arrived with a military force on 8 and 9 August to disarm the city. During that time thousands of refugees flocked around the police post in the town, where they were told by officials that they would be safe under the Iraqi flag. 

10 August saw the arrival of Kurdish and Arab looters who, undeterred by the local police, took away the freshly cut wheat and barley. During the night of 10–11 August, the Arab inhabitants of Simele joined the looting. The Assyrian villagers could only watch as their Arab neighbours drove their flocks before them.

On 11 August the villagers were ordered to leave the police post and return to their homes, which they began to do with some reluctance. As they were heading back Iraqi soldiers in armoured cars arrived, and the Iraqi flag flying over the police post was pulled down. Without warning or obvious provocation, the troops began to fire indiscriminately into the defenseless Assyrians. Ismael Abbawi Tohalla, the commanding officer, then ordered his troops not to target women. 

Stafford described the ensuing massacre:

In his depiction of the massacre, Mar Shimun states:

The official Iraqi account—that the Assyrian casualties were sustained during a short battle with Kurdish and Arab tribes—has been discredited by all historians. Khaldun Husry claims that the mass killing was not premeditated and that the responsibility lies on the shoulders of Ismael Abbawi, a junior officer in the army.

On 13 August, Bakr Sidqi moved his troops to Alqosh, where he planned to inflict a further massacre on the Assyrians who found refuge there.

Targeted villages

The main campaign lasted until 16 August 1933, but violent raids on Assyrians were being reported up to the end of the month. The campaign resulted in one third of the Assyrian population of Iraq fleeing to Syria.

Aftermath

On 18 August 1933, Iraqi troops entered Mosul, where they were given an enthusiastic reception by its Muslim inhabitants. Triumphant arches were erected and decorated with melons pierced with daggers, symbolising the heads of murdered Assyrians. The crown prince Ghazi himself came to the city to award 'victorious' colours to those military and tribal leaders who participated in the massacres and the looting. Anti-Christian feeling was at its height in Mosul, and the Christians of the city were largely confined to their homes during the whole month in fear of further action by the frenzied mob.

The Iraqi Army later paraded in the streets of Baghdad in celebration of its victories. Bakr Sidqi was promoted; he later led Iraq's first military coup and became prime minister.

Immediately after the massacre and the repression of the alleged Assyrian uprising, the Iraqi government demanded a conscription bill. Non-Assyrian Iraqi tribesmen offered to serve in the Iraqi army in order to counter the Assyrians. In late August, the government of Mosul demanded that the central government 'ruthlessly' stamp out the rebellion, eliminate all foreign influence in Iraqi affairs, and take immediate steps to enact a law for compulsory military service. The next week, 49 Kurdish tribal chieftains joined in a pro-conscription telegram to the government, expressing thanks for punishing the 'Assyrian insurgents', stating that a "nation can be proud of itself only through its power, and since evidence of this power is the army," requesting compulsory military service. 

Rashid Ali al-Gaylani presented the bill to the parliament. His government fell, however, before conscription was enacted; Jamil al-Midfai's government did so in February 1934.

The massacres and looting had a deep psychological impact on the Assyrians. Stafford reported their low morale upon arrival in Alqosh:

Because of the massacre, around 6,200 Assyrians left the Nineveh Plains immediately for the neighbouring French Mandate of Syria, and were later joined by 15,000 refugees the following years. They concentrated in the Jazira region and built a number of villages on the banks of the Khabur River.

King Faysal, who had recently returned to Iraq from a medical vacation, was under great physical stress during the crisis. His health deteriorated even more during the hot summer days in Baghdad; the British chargé d'affaires described meeting him in his pajamas as he sat in his bed on 15 August, denying that a massacre had been committed in Simele. Faysal left Iraq again on 2 September 1933, seeking a cooler climate in London, where he died five days later.

Mar Shimun, who had been detained since June 1933, was forced into exile along with his extended family, despite initial British reluctance. He was flown on an RAF plane to Cyprus on 18 August 1933, and to the United States in 1949, forcing the head of the Assyrian Church of the East to relocate to Chicago, where it remained until 2015. 

In 1948, Shimun met with the representatives of Iraq, Syria and Iran in Washington, subsequently calling upon his followers to "live as loyal citizens wherever they resided in the Middle East" and relinquishing his role as a temporal leader and the nationalistic role of the church. This left a power vacuum in Assyrian politics that was filled by the Assyrian Universal Alliance in 1968.

The seat of the Assyrian Church of the East remained in the United States even during the times of Patriarch Mar Dinkha IV. Only with the newly consecrated Patriarch Mar Gewargis III in 2015 did the patriarchal seat of the Assyrian Church of the East return to Iraq relocating in Ankawa in north Iraq.

Responsibility for the massacres
Official British sources estimate the total number of all Assyrians killed during August 1933 at around 600, while Assyrian sources put the figure at 3,000. 

Historians disagree as to who was responsible for ordering the mass killings. Stafford blames Arab nationalists, most prominently Rashid Ali al-Gaylani and Bakr Sidqi. According to him, Iraqi Army officers despised the Assyrians, and Sidqi in particular was vocal in his hatred for them. This view was also shared by British officials who recommended to Faysal not to send Sidqi to the north during the crisis. 

According to some historians, the agitation against the Assyrians was also encouraged by Rashid Ali al-Gaylani's Arab nationalist government, which saw it as a distraction from the continuous Shiite revolt in the southern part of the country.

Husry blamed the Assyrians for starting the crisis and absolved Sidqi from ordering the mass killing in Simele. He hinted that Faysal was the authority who might have issued orders to exterminate Assyrian males. Kanan Makiya, a leftist Iraqi historian, presents the actions taken by the military as a manifestation of the nationalist anti-imperialist paranoia which was to culminate with the Ba'athists ascending to power in the 1960s. Fadhil al-Barrak, an Iraqi Ba'athist historian, credits Sidqi as the author of the whole campaign and the ensuing massacres. For him, the events were part of a history of Iraq prior to the true nationalist revolution.

British role
Iraqi–British relations entered a short cooling-down period during and after the crisis. The Iraqis were previously encouraged by the British to detain Patriarch Shimun in order to defuse tensions. The British were also wary of Iraqi military leaders and recommended Sidqi, a senior ethnic Kurdish general who was stationed in Mosul, be transferred to another region due to his open animosity towards the Assyrians. Later, they had to intervene to dissuade Faysal from personally leading a tribal force to punish the Assyrians.

The general Iraqi public opinion, promoted by newspapers, that the Assyrians were proxies used by the British to undermine the newly established kingdom, was also shared by some leading officials, including the prime minister. British and European protests following the massacre only confirmed to them that the "Assyrian rebellion" was the work of European imperialism.

Both King George V of the United Kingdom and Cosmo Gordon Lang, the Bishop of Canterbury, took a personal interest in the Assyrian affair. British representatives at home demanded from Faysal that Sidqi and other culprits be tried and punished. The massacres were seen in Europe as a jihad against a small Christian minority.

In the long term, however, the British backed Iraq and rejected an international inquiry into the killings, fearing that this may provoke further massacres against Christians. They also did not insist on punishing the offenders, who were now seen as heroes by Iraqis. The official British stance was to defend the Iraqi government for its perseverance and patience in dealing with the crisis and to attribute the massacres to rogue army units. A report on the battle of Dirabun blames the Assyrians, defends the actions of the Iraqi Army, and commends Sidqi as a good officer.

The change in British attitude towards the Assyrians gave rise to the notion of a "British betrayal" among some Assyrian circles. This charge first surfaced after 1918, when the British did not follow through with their repeated promises to resettle Assyrians where they would be safe following the Assyrian genocide launched by the Ottomans during the First World War.

Cultural impact and legacy

In the Assyrian community worldwide, 7 August has officially become known as Assyrian Martyrs Day, also known as the National Day of Mourning, in memory for the Simele massacre, declared so by the Assyrian Universal Alliance in 1970. In 2004, the Syrian government banned an Assyrian political organization from commemorating the event and threatened arrests if any were to break the ban.

The massacres also had a deep impact on the newly established Kingdom of Iraq. Kanan Makiya argues that the killing of Assyrians transcended tribal, religious, ideological and ethnic barriers as Sunni Arabs, Shia Arabs, Sunni Kurds, Sunni Turkmen, Shia Turkmen, and Yazidis, as well as Monarchists, Islamists, nationalists, royalists, conservatives, Leftists, federalists, and tribalists, were all united in their anti-Assyrian and anti-Christian sentiments. According to him, the pogrom was "the first genuine expression of national independence in a former Arab province of the Ottoman Empire" and that the killing of Assyrian Christians was seen as a national duty.

The British were standing firmly behind the leaders of their former colony during the crisis, despite the popular animosity towards them. Brigadier General E. H. Headlam of the British military mission in Baghdad was quoted saying "the government and people have good reasons to be thankful to Colonel Bakr Sidqi".

See also

 History of the Assyrians
 Assyrian struggle for independence
 Sayfo
 1935–1936 Iraqi Shia revolts
 List of massacres in Iraq
 List of modern conflicts in the Middle East

Notes

References

Further reading

Conflicts in 1933
Massacres in 1933
Massacres of ethnic groups
20th century in Iraq
Mass murder in 1933
Massacres in Iraq
1933 in Iraq
Persecution of Assyrians in Iraq
Massacres of Christians
August 1933 events
Simele